In enzymology, a L-iditol 2-dehydrogenase is an enzyme that catalyzes the chemical reaction

L-iditol + NAD+   L-sorbose + NADH + H+

Thus, the two substrates of this enzyme are L-iditol and NAD+, whereas its 3 products are L-sorbose, NADH, and H+.

This enzyme belongs to the family of oxidoreductases, specifically those acting on the CH-OH group of donor with NAD+ or NADP+ as acceptor. The systematic name of this enzyme class is L-iditol:NAD+ 2-oxidoreductase. Other names in common use include polyol dehydrogenase, sorbitol dehydrogenase, L-iditol:NAD+ 5-oxidoreductase, L-iditol (sorbitol) dehydrogenase, glucitol dehydrogenase, L-iditol:NAD+ oxidoreductase, NAD+-dependent sorbitol dehydrogenase, NAD+-dependent sorbitol dehydrogenase, and NAD+-sorbitol dehydrogenase. This enzyme participates in fructose and mannose metabolism.

Structural studies

References

 
 
 
 
 

EC 1.1.1
NADH-dependent enzymes
Enzymes of known structure